The 1944 Washington Huskies football team was an American football team that represented the University of Washington during the 1944 college football season. In its third season under head coach Ralph Welch, the team compiled a 5–3 record, finished second in the Pacific Coast Conference, and outscored its opponents 293 to 132. Jim McCurdy was the team captain.

Schedule

NFL Draft selections
Five Huskies were selected in the 1945 NFL Draft, which lasted 32 rounds with 330 selections.

References

Washington
Washington Huskies football seasons
Washington Huskies football